In Full Swing is the sequel to Mark O'Connor's Hot Swing Trio's album Hot Swing!.

Track listing
All songs except "One Beautiful Evening" were either written by or arranged by Mark O'Connor.
"In Full Swing" (O'Connor) – 3:55
"Honeysuckle Rose" (Thomas Waller, Andy Razaf, Harry Da Costa) – 5:14
"Tiger Rag" (D. James LaRocca, Edwin Edwards, Henry W. Ragas, Larry Shields, Anthony Sbararo, Harry Da Costa) – 5:20
"Misty" (Johnny Burke, Erroll Garner) – 6:56
"Stéphane and Django" (O'Connor) – 5:50
"Fascinating Rhythm" (George Gershwin, Ira Gershwin) – 3:46
"3 For All" (Burr) – 6:08
"As Time Goes By" (Herman Hupfeld) – 5:56
"Limehouse Blues" (Philip Braham, Douglas Furber) – 7:22
"One Beautiful Evening" (Vignola) – 6:48

Personnel
Mark O'Connor – Violin
Frank Vignola – Guitar
Jon Burr – Bass
with
Wynton Marsalis – Trumpet
Jane Monheit – Vocal
also
Steve Epstein and Mark O'Connor – Producers
Richard King – Recording Engineer

References

Mark O'Connor albums
2002 albums